Bradley Matufueni M'bondo (born 30 October 2001) is a French professional footballer who plays as a defender for Ligue 2 club Chamois Niortais.

Professional career
Matufueni is a youth product of Drancy, and joined the youth academy of Niort in 2017. Matufeni made his professional debut with Niort in a 2-2 Ligue 2 tie with Paris FC on 26 September 2020.

Career statistics

References

External links
 

Living people
2001 births
Footballers from Paris
French footballers
Association football fullbacks
Chamois Niortais F.C. players
Ligue 2 players
Championnat National 3 players